The International Simulation and Gaming Association (ISAGA) is an international organization for scientists and practitioners who develop and use simulation, gaming (in the meaning of learning games) and related methodologies: role-play, structured experiences, policy exercises, computer simulation, play, virtual reality, game theory, debriefing, experiential learning, and active learning. Gambling is expressly excluded from the interests of the organization.

See also
 Serious game
 Business game

Further reading
Simulation and Gaming Across Disciplines and Cultures: ISAGA at a watershed, a 25th ISAGA anniversary conference highlights

References

Role-playing game associations
International trade associations
International organisations based in the Netherlands